

A
"A Felicidade"
"Anna Julia"
"Agua de Beber (Water to Drink)"
"Águas de Março (Waters of March)"
"Aquarela do Brasil"

B
"Bim-Bom"
Brazilian Football Songs

C
 "Chega de Saudade (No More Blues)"
 "Cidade Maravilhosa"
 "Corcovado (Quiet Nights of Quiet Stars)"

D
"Desafinado (Slightly Out of Tune)"
"Dindi"

E

este seu olhar

F
Forro Dos Cumpadre

G
"Garota de Ipanema (The Girl from Ipanema)"

H
"Hino à Bandeira Nacional (Anthem to the National Flag)"
"Hino da Independência (Anthem to the Independence)
"Hino Nacional Brasileiro (National Anthem)"

I
"Insensatez (How Insentitive)"
"Inútil Paisagem (If You Never Come To Me)"

J

K

L

M
"Manhã de Carnaval"
"Mas Que Nada"
"Meditação (Meditation)"

N
"Na Baixa do Sapateiro (Bahia)"

O
"Os Grillos (Crickets Sing For Anamaria)"
"Os Quindins de Yayá"
"Outra Vez (Once Again)"

P

Q

R

S
"Samba de Uma Nota Só (One Note Samba)"
"Samba de Verão (Summer Samba)"
"Se Todos Fossem Iguais A Você (Someone to Light Up My Life)"

T
 Taj Mahal

U

V
"Vou te Contar (Wave)"

X
"Xangô"

W

Y

Z

Brazil
Songs